Iodo (이어도), also called Io Island, is a 1977 South Korean mystery film directed by Kim Ki-young, and based on the 1974 novel of the same title by Lee Cheong-jun. The title of the movie comes from the real-life island of Ieodo, which also inspired several plot elements of the film. It was shown at the 28th Berlin International Film Festival.

Plot
When a man from an island ruled by women disappears, the man suspected of killing him investigates his past.

Cast
Lee Hwa-si as Sohn Min-ja (The barmaid)
Choi Yun-seok as Cheon Nam-seok
Kim Chung-chul as Sun Wu-hyun
Park Jung-ja as the shaman
Park Am as the editor-in-chief of Jeju Ilbo, a fictional newspaper
Kwon Mi-Hae as Park Yeo-in
Yeo Po
Ko Sang-mi
Lee Joung-ae
Son Young-soon

Release
In February 2012, Taewon Entertainment, in partnership with the Korean Film Archive, had released the film on DVD.

References

Bibliography

External links

Screen Slate write-up by Patrick Dahl

1977 drama films
South Korean mystery films
Films set in Jeju
Films shot in Jeju
Films based on Korean novels
Films based on mystery novels
Films directed by Kim Ki-young
1970s Korean-language films